The 1998–99 NLA season was the 61st regular season of the Nationalliga A.

Regular season

Final standings

Playoffs

Quarterfinals

Semifinals

Finals

References
sehv.ch
hockeystats.ch

External links
hockeyfans.ch
eishockeyforum.ch
spoor.ch

1
Swiss